Josh Daicos (born 26 November 1998) is a professional Australian rules footballer playing for the Collingwood Football Club in the Australian Football League (AFL). Son of Peter Daicos, who played for Collingwood in the VFL/AFL, he played for the Oakleigh Chargers in the TAC Cup before he was drafted with pick 57 in 2016 under the father–son rule.

State football
Daicos played junior football with Bulleen-Templestowe and the Greythorn Falcons, both part of the Yarra Junior Football League, as well as at his school, Camberwell Grammar. He entered the TAC Cup in 2016, playing for the Oakleigh Chargers. During the season, he kicked 11 goals in 10 games. He also represented Vic Metro at the 2016 AFL Under 18 Championships, scoring goals against the Allies and against Western Australia. At the end of the season, Daicos was invited to the AFL Draft Combine, along with four other players, including Sam McLarty who was later drafted to Collingwood with him.

AFL career
Daicos was drafted by Collingwood with pick 57, which was their last pick, in the 2016 national draft under the father–son rule. His father wore the number 35 guernsey, which since 2010 is given to the first draft pick every year to wear in their debut season, but Daicos chose to wear number 26 to create his own legacy. He got his first taste of AFL football, playing in the 2017 JLT Community Series, especially impressing against Essendon. Daicos made his debut in the eleven point loss to Geelong at the Melbourne Cricket Ground in round 22 of the 2017 season. He made two appearances in his debut season, before adding 10 consecutive appearances in the 2018 season. After the season, Daicos signed a two-year contract extension with Collingwood. In the 2020 season, Daicos had a breakout year, playing every one of Collingwood's 18 games between the home-and-away season and the finals. At the end of the 2020 season, Daicos was selected for the season's 22under22 team, and he signed on with Collingwood for two more years. During the 2020 Brownlow Medal ceremony, he was awarded the Goal of the Year for his single-handed effort from the boundary in Round 10 to seal a victory against Sydney.

Personal life
Daicos is the son of former Collingwood great, Peter Daicos. His brother, Nick Daicos, also plays Australian rules football with Oakleigh Chargers and will be eligible for the 2021 AFL draft as a potential father–son pick for Collingwood. Daicos grew up supporting Collingwood as a child.

Statistics
Updated to the end of the 2022 season.

|-
| 2017 ||  || 26
| 2 || 1 || 1 || 10 || 12 || 22 || 4 || 12 || 0.5 || 0.5 || 5.0 || 6.0 || 11.0 || 2.0 || 6.0 || 0
|- 
| 2018 ||  || 26
| 10 || 5 || 2 || 87 || 68 || 155 || 34 || 37 || 0.5 || 0.2 || 8.7 || 6.8 || 15.5 || 3.4 || 3.7 || 0
|-
| 2019 ||  || 26
| 5 || 1 || 2 || 40 || 45 || 85 || 19 || 13 || 0.2 || 0.4 || 8.0 || 9.0 || 17.0 || 3.8 || 2.6 || 0
|- 
| 2020 ||  || 26
| 18 || 10 || 3 || 169 || 143 || 312 || 68 || 42 || 0.6 || 0.2 || 9.4 || 7.9 || 17.3 || 3.8 || 2.3 || 2
|-
| 2021 ||  || 7
| 17 || 9 || 9 || 173 || 149 || 322 || 48 || 53 || 0.5 || 0.5 || 10.2 || 8.8 || 18.9 || 2.8 || 3.1 || 0
|-
| 2022 ||  || 7
| 25 || 15 || 11 || 314 || 213 || 527 || 101 || 65 || 0.6 || 0.4 || 12.6 || 8.5 || 21.1 || 4.0 || 2.6 || 4
|- class=sortbottom
! colspan=3 | Career
! 77 !! 41 !! 28 !! 793 !! 630 !! 1423 !! 274 !! 222 !! 0.5 !! 0.4 !! 10.3 !! 8.2 !! 18.5 !! 3.6 !! 2.9 !! 6
|}

Notes

Honours and achievements
Individual
 AFL Goal of the Year: 2020
 22under22 team: 2020

References

External links

1998 births
Living people
Australian people of Macedonian descent
Collingwood Football Club players
Oakleigh Chargers players
Australian rules footballers from Victoria (Australia)